Eva Yaneva (Bulgarian Cyrillic: Ева Янева, born 31 July 1985 in Sofia) is a Bulgarian volleyball player. She currently plays for Volero Le Cannet in France.

Career
She started playing volleyball in 1996 at the age of 11 with CSKA Sofia.

Yaneva has played for teams that finished 7th and 8th in the 2004 and 2006 European Championships, respectively; the 2006 champion of the French Cup; and three champions of Bulgaria.

National team
Yaneva is a key player for the Bulgaria women's national volleyball team and has captained it on occasions. In 2011, she was banned from participating in the 2011 Women's European Volleyball Championship due to supposed disciplinary breaches, but has since then been reinstated to the national side and continues to be a regular for the team. She competed at the 2021 Women's European Volleyball League, winning a gold medal.

Clubs
 CSKA Sofia (1996-2004)
 Indesit Lipetsk (2004-2005)
 RC Cannes (2005-2010)
 Omichka Omsk (2010-2011)
 Dynamo Moscow (2011-2012)
 JT Marvelous (2012-2013)
 RC Cannes (2013-2014)
 Dynamo Kazan (2014-2015)
 CSM București (January 2015-May 2015)
 Tianjin Volleyball (2015-2016)
 Sarıyer Bld. (2016-2017)
 Guangdong Evergrande Volleyball Club (Women) (2017-2018)
 Strabag VC FTVS UK Bratislava (2018-2019)
 Developres SkyRes Rzeszów  (Jan. 2019 - May 2019)
 Volero Le Cannet (2019 - )

Awards

National team
Women's European Volleyball League

  : 2010, 2012
  : 2009, 2011

Boris Yeltsin Volleyball Cup

  : 2014
 : 2008

Individual Awards

 2018-2019 Best outside hitter MEVZA League

References

External links
The profile of Eva Yaneva
 
Eva Yaneva on Volleybox

1985 births
Bulgarian women's volleyball players
Sportspeople from Sofia
Living people
Bulgarian expatriate sportspeople in France
Bulgarian expatriate sportspeople in Japan
Outside hitters
Bulgarian expatriates in Russia
Bulgarian expatriate sportspeople in Romania
Bulgarian expatriates in China
Bulgarian expatriate sportspeople in Turkey
Expatriate volleyball players in Russia
Expatriate volleyball players in France
Expatriate volleyball players in Japan
Expatriate volleyball players in Romania
Expatriate volleyball players in China
Expatriate volleyball players in Turkey